Carlos Espínola may refer to:

Carlos Espínola (footballer, born 1975), Paraguayan defender
Carlos Espínola (footballer, born 1995), Argentine midfielder
Carlos Espínola (sailor) (born 1971), Argentine windsurfer